Lemuel Sawyer (1777 – January 9, 1852) was an American politician who served as a U.S. Representative from North Carolina.

Sawyer was born in Camden County, near Elizabeth City, North Carolina. He attended Flatbush Academy, Long Island, New York, and was graduated from the University of North Carolina at Chapel Hill in 1799. He attended the University of Pennsylvania at Philadelphia for a time. He studied law and was admitted to the bar in 1804 and commenced practice in Elizabeth City, North Carolina.

Sawyer was a member of the State House of Commons in 1800 and 1801. He was elected to the Tenth, Eleventh, and Twelfth Congresses (March 4, 1807 – March 3, 1813) as a Democratic-Republican, and the Fifteenth, Sixteenth, and Seventeenth as a Jacksonian (March 4, 1817 – March 3, 1823). He ran unsuccessfully in 1822 for the Eighteenth Congress. Sawyer was elected to the Nineteenth and Twentieth Congresses (March 4, 1825 – March 3, 1829), but was not reelected in 1828 to the Twenty-first Congress. He was department clerk in Washington, D.C., until his death in that city.

External links 

1777 births
1852 deaths
People from Camden County, North Carolina
Members of the North Carolina House of Representatives
University of North Carolina at Chapel Hill alumni
Democratic-Republican Party members of the United States House of Representatives from North Carolina
Jacksonian members of the United States House of Representatives from North Carolina
19th-century American politicians